Tuoba is a genus of 17 species of centipedes, in the family Geophilidae. It was described by American biologist Ralph Vary Chamberlin in 1920. Centipedes in this genus range from 2 cm to 5 cm in length, have 39 to 73 pairs of legs, and are found in coastal regions and islands in the Mediterranean and in the Atlantic, Pacific, and Indian oceans.

Species
Valid species:

 Tuoba ashmoleorum Lewis, 1996
 Tuoba baeckstroemi (Verhoeff K.W., 1924)
 Tuoba benoiti (Matic & Darabantu, 1977)
 Tuoba culebrae (Silvestri, 1908)
 Tuoba hartmeyeri (Attems, 1911)
 Tuoba japonicus (Fahlander, 1935)
 Tuoba kozuensis (Takakuwa, 1934)
 Tuoba laticeps (Pocock, 1891)
 Tuoba laticollis (Attems, 1903)
 Tuoba littoralis (Takakuwa, 1934)
 Tuoba pallida Jones, 1998
 Tuoba poseidonis (Verhoeff, 1901)
 Tuoba sudanensis (Lewis, 1963)
 Tuoba sydneyensis (Pocock, 1891)
 Tuoba tiosianus (Takakuwa, 1934)
 Tuoba xylophaga (Attems, 1903)
 Tuoba zograffi (Brölemann, 1900)

References

 

 
 
Centipede genera
Animals described in 1920
Taxa named by Ralph Vary Chamberlin